The Apostolic Union of Secular Priests is an association of Roman Catholic secular priests (i.e. priests who are not monastics and do not belong to any religious institute). It was founded in the seventeenth century by the German communitarian priest Bartholomew Holzhauser. The organization's function "was partly to ease, through 'a uniform rule of life', the crippling loneliness which was often felt by priests ... 'who are scattered far apart'."

In 1903, Pope Pius X placed the union under his special protection. In 1913, it was reorganized in France by Canon Lebeurier.

References

Footnotes

Bibliography

 
 
 

Catholic organizations established in the 17th century
Catholic orders and societies